The Link Lake Deformation Zone, also known as the Link Lake Zone of Deformation and the Link Lake Shear Zone, is a zone of deformation in Strathy Township of Temagami, Ontario, Canada.

See also
Net Lake-Vermilion Lake Deformation Zone
Northeast Arm Deformation Zone
Tasse Lake Deformation Zone

References

Geologic faults of Temagami
Strathy Township
Shear zones